K. Annamalai is an Indian politician and former Member of the Legislative Assembly. He is part of All India Anna Dravida Munnetra Kazhagam and won the 2001 Tamil Nadu state assembly election with 62,454 votes in the Tenkasi constituency.

See also 
 K. Ravi Arunan
 Karuppasamy Pandian
 Politics of India

References 

All India Anna Dravida Munnetra Kazhagam politicians
Living people
Year of birth missing (living people)